Vianello may refer to:

People
Edoardo Vianello (born 1938), Italian singer, composer and actor
Marco Vianello (born 1983), Italian footballer
Raimondo Vianello (1922–2010), Italian actor, comedian and television presenter

Television series
Casa Vianello, Italian comedy series
Cascina Vianello, Italian television series
I misteri di Cascina Vianello, Italian television series